Women's Art Colony Farm (also referred to as The Farm or Women's Art Colony and Tree Farm) was a self-supporting women's artist colony in LaGrange, New York (outside of Poughkeepsie, New York) founded by Kate Millett and Sophie Keir in 1978.

Founding

In 1970 the artist and activist Kate Millett published Sexual Politics. The wildly popular book netted Millett approximately $30,000 in earnings. One year later, in 1971, Millettalong with future wife, photojournalist Sophie Keirbought 10 acres of land and buildings in LaGrange, New York, a small town in Dutchess County and close to Poughkeepsie. The pair began restoring the property's fields and buildings.

In 1978, the Women's Art Colony was established, financed by selling Christmas trees.

Women applied to work at The Farm, also paying a small fee for food, in exchange for room, board and studio space.

The Farm was also a space for feminist discussion.

The New York Times described The Farm as: "a utopian women’s arts colony, and where bare-breasted women grew Christmas trees that Ms. Millett would sell on the Bowery each December. In the early days, said Linda Clarke, an old friend, neighbors would complain about the nudity and call the police, until Ms. Millett won them over."

In 2012, The Farm was registered as a non-profit organization, and was renamed the Millett Center for the Arts.

Awards
In 2012, Millett won a grant from the Foundation for Contemporary Arts to, in-part, create an archive of The Farm.

Legacy
Sisters of Jam, an artists collective based in Stockholm, Sweden, created a book based on The Farm, called A Piece of Land. The collective was invited to stay at The Farm in 2010, by Millett. The book includes photographs by Michelle Koals and Jane Winter, past residents of The Farm, as well as archival artifacts. The collective have participated in several talks and exhibitions to showcase work based around The Farm.

References

External links
 Women's Art Colony Farm records at the Sophia Smith Collection, Smith College Special Collections
 Kate Millett papers at the Rubenstein Library, Duke University
 A Piece of Land by Sisters of Jam
 "Photographs from 'The Farm'" by Sisters of Jam

Artist residencies
Poughkeepsie, New York
Artist colonies
1978 establishments in New York (state)
Organizations established in 1978
Feminist art organizations in the United States
American artist groups and collectives
Arts charities
Arts organizations established in the 1970s
History of women in New York (state)